Michaux may refer to:

Places
 Michaux, Virginia
 Michaux State Forest, a Pennsylvania state forest

Other uses
 Michaux (surname), a French surname
 Elder Michaux, an American television series

See also
 Michaud
 Micheaux